Tower Grove Christian Academy is a PreK-12 Coed Private Christian School located in Saint Louis, Missouri. It is directly adjacent to Tower Grove Park.

About
TGCA provides education to PreK-8th Grade Students with a Baptist Christian biblical worldview. The school is owned by Tower Grove Baptist Church.[3]..

References

Educational institutions established in 1978
High schools in St. Louis
Buildings and structures in St. Louis